Yale Law Review may refer to:

 Yale Law Journal
 Yale Law & Policy Review
 Yale Review of Law and Social Action